Mu Epsilon Theta is a National Catholic Service Sorority that was officially recognized at the University of Texas in Austin, Texas on January 16, 1987.

Mu Epsilon Theta Founding and History
Mu Epsilon Theta is a Catholic sorority that was founded at the University of Texas at Austin to unite college women by promoting academics, leadership, community service, and moral and spiritual well-being.

Mu Epsilon Theta was officially recognized at UT on January 16, 1987. In the spring of 1996 the Alpha Chapter at UT gave Texas State University, formerly Southwest Texas State University, the opportunity to pledge their Omicron Class and in the Spring of 1997 which then officially became the Beta Chapter of Mu Epsilon Theta at Texas State University. In the spring of 2013 Mu Epsilon Theta gave Arizona State University the opportunity to begin the pledge process and officially became the Gamma Chapter the Spring of 2015.

Symbols
The symbols of Mu Epsilon Theta are:

 Motto: Our Strength is from Above
 Patron Saint: Saint Catherine of Laboure
 Symbol: The Trinity
 Mascot: The Lamb
 Official Colors: Black, Yellow, and Silver
 Official Flower: The Yellow Rose
 Official Stones: Onyx, Topaz, and Diamond

Mu Epsilon Theta Chapters and Charters

References

Christian fraternities and sororities in the United States
1987 establishments in Texas
Student organizations established in 1987
Christian organizations established in 1987